is a Japanese football player. He plays as a central midfielder for FC Machida Zelvia in the J2 League.

Career

After graduating from Higashi Fukuoka High School in his native Kyushu, Takae signed his first professional contract with Gamba Osaka ahead of the 2017 season. He didn't feature for Gamba's first team during his debut campaign but did score 2 goals in 30 appearances for Gamba Under-23 in J3 League.

2018 saw him get more top team action, he made his J1 debut in the Osaka derby match at home to Cerezo Osaka on 21 April.   The match finished in a 1-0 win for Gamba as a result of Hwang Ui-jo's first half penalty.   Takae played the full 90 minutes. He went on to play a total of 9 times in the league and 7 times in the J.League Cup during the 2018 season while also having time to play 16 games for Gamba Under-23 as they finished 6th in J3 League.

Career statistics

Last update: 2 December 2018

Reserves performance

Last Updated: 2 December 2018

References

External links

1998 births
Living people
Association football people from Kumamoto Prefecture
Japanese footballers
J1 League players
J3 League players
J2 League players
Roasso Kumamoto players
Gamba Osaka players
Gamba Osaka U-23 players
FC Machida Zelvia players
Association football midfielders